Wilbert Das (born 2 December 1963) is a Dutch fashion designer.

Biography
Wilbert Das spent his formative years working on his parents dairy farm in the small village of Riethoven in the southern Netherlands. At age 19 he left Riethoven to study fashion design at the Academy of Fine Arts in Arnhem, where he received his diploma in 1988. Intrigued by the revolution that was taking place in Italian fashion, after graduating from Arnhem Das travelled to Italy for an interview with clothing manufacturer Renzo Rosso, the owner of the fashion brand Diesel. Das was offered a job on the spot and started working at Diesel that day in the role of assistant male designer on the Male, Accessories, Leather and Kids lines, but was soon directing the style office. In 1993 Das was recognized with the title of Creative Director.

Collection Design

During Das's early years with Diesel, the company became most famous for its denim collections. Throughout this time Diesel used many techniques to age jeans and give them a more vintage feel, including experimentation with dyes, destruction, movement of pockets, reshaping and introduction of curves.

In subsequent years, under Das's creative direction Diesel introduced collections of footwear, eyewear (Diesel Shades), jewellery (Diesel Jewellery), and watches (Diesel Timeframes).

Communications & Advertising

As well as being responsible for the development of all Diesel's fashion and accessories collection, in his role as Creative Director, Das also oversaw the creative aspects of every Diesel campaign from the time the company began advertising until 2009. The influence of Diesel's communications campaigns, published under the umbrella label “For Successful Living”, have won Diesel and Das the Grand Prix, Gold, and ‘Advertiser of the Year’ awards at the International Festival of Advertising at Cannes.

References

Related content
 www.nypost.com NY Post
 www.creativereview.co.uk Creative Review
 www.washingtonpost.com Washing Post
 www.stylefinder.com Style Finder
 www.coolhunting.com Cool Hunting
 www.vogue.co.uk Vogue
 www.elleuk.com Elle
 www.zimbio.com Zimbio
 www.fashionwindows.com Fashion Windows
 www.harpersbazaar.com Harpers Bazaar
 www.finnexpo.fi Finnexpo
 dieselfreak.blogspot.com Diesel Freak
 www.drapersonline.com Drapers Online
 stylelist.out.com Style LIst

1963 births
Living people
Dutch fashion designers
People from Bergeijk